The Adirondack is an intercity rail passenger train operated daily, partially along the Empire Corridor,  by Amtrak between New York City and Montreal. The Adirondack is financed by the New York State Department of Transportation. Service was suspended in March 2020 due to the closure of the Canadian/American border in response to the COVID-19 pandemic; weekday service returned between New York City and Albany resumed on December 5, 2022. Full service is expected to resume by April 3, 2023.

For most of its existence, the Adirondack has been plagued by numerous delays. Amtrak only owns two legs of the route, in Manhattan and between Poughkeepsie and Schenectady. Additionally, the route crosses an international boundary where immigration procedures can take up to two hours. The on-time performance of the route averaged 64.8% for the year ending June 2016. According to Amtrak, 28.8% of the train delay was due to track- and signal-related problems, especially along the Delaware & Hudson segment, which is now owned by Canadian Pacific Railway.

History 

At the inception of Amtrak on May 1, 1971, the Delaware & Hudson operated two trains between Albany, New York and Montreal: the Montreal Limited (overnight) and the Laurentian (day). Both trains were discontinued, and for three years the D&H line saw no service. Amtrak service to Montreal began in 1972 with the Montrealer, which ran through Vermont rather than New York.

The Adirondack began running on August 6, 1974 (with a ceremonial train the previous day) from Grand Central Terminal in New York to Albany, then over the D&H's line to Windsor Station in Montreal. From the outset the train operated with financial support from the state of New York. The train initially operated as a section of the New York–Buffalo Empire State Express.

The Adirondack used CP Rail's Windsor Station until January 12, 1986, when it was rerouted to CN Rail's Central Station. Until the Empire Connection was built in 1991, the train served Grand Central Terminal instead of Penn Station in New York City.

21st century

As part of an effort to improve on-time performance along the Empire Corridor, Amtrak reached an agreement with CSX to lease the CSX Hudson Subdivision between Poughkeepsie and Schenectady. Starting in 2012, Amtrak effectively took operational control of the Hudson Subdivision, handling all maintenance and capital responsibilities. Even with this move, Amtrak still operates less than half of the trackage along the Adirondack route.

In 2012, U.S. Customs and Border Protection began planning a preclearance facility at Montreal Central Station, which would allow departing passengers to be prescreened in Montreal, where northbound passengers would be processed by the Canada Border Services Agency upon arrival, rather than at the border itself.  Presently, the Adirondack must stop at Lacolle, Quebec northbound and Rouses Point, New York southbound for immigration procedures that can take up to two hours. By early 2017, the United States Congress had passed its necessary enabling legislation. The corresponding Canadian legislation was given royal assent in late 2017, though it is yet to enter into force.

On April 10, 2018, Amtrak announced that all trains using the Empire Connection, excluding the Lake Shore Limited, would operate into Grand Central Terminal from May 26 to September 4, 2018, to allow work on the Empire Tunnel, the Spuyten Duyvil movable bridge, and Track 19 in New York's Penn Station.

For most of the summer of 2019, the northbound Adirondack ran combined with the northbound Maple Leaf due to infrastructure work at Penn Station, splitting in Albany. The two trains ran separately on weekends during July and August.

COVID-19 pandemic

In March 2020, the Adirondack was truncated to Albany–Rensselaer after all non-essential travel across the Canada-United States border was banned in response to the COVID-19 pandemic.

In October 2022, Amtrak began running crew re-qualification trips in preparation of the train's return. Service from New York City to Albany resumed on December 5, 2022. Full service resumption to Montreal is expected in the spring of 2023, following delays. On March 10, 2023, it was announced that service would resume by April 3, 2023.

Operation

Equipment 
Most Adirondack trains consist of five to seven cars hauled by a locomotive.

The passenger cars are the Amfleet series built by the Budd Company in the mid-1970s to early-1980s. Most trains include a Café car (food service/lounge) and four to six Coach Class cars. Unlike other Empire Corridor trains, the Adirondack does not offer business class seating.

All cars offer complimentary WiFi, an electric outlet (120 V, 60 Hz AC) at each seat, reading lamps, fold-out tray tables. Passengers self-select seats on a first-come, first-served basis. Reservations are required on all trains, tickets may be purchased online, from an agent at some stations, a ticketing machine at most stations, or, at a higher cost, from the conductor on the train.

The locomotives operate on third rail electric power in Penn Station and the Empire Connection tunnel and on diesel power for the rest of the route. Between Albany–Rensselaer and Montréal traditional diesel-only GE Genesis locomotives are used.

The Adirondack debuted in 1974 with D&H equipment, much of it ex-Laurentian, as Amtrak was experiencing equipment shortages. These were supplemented by a pair of Skyline dome cars leased from the Canadian Pacific Railway. Two D&H ALCO PA diesel locomotives hauled each train. On March 1, 1977, new Turboliner gas turbine trainsets took over from the D&H cars. Conventional Amtrak equipment would eventually displace the Turboliners.

In the coming years all equipment will be replaced with Amtrak Airo trainsets, the railroad's branding of its combination of Siemens Venture passenger cars and a Siemens Charger diesel-electric locomotive. The trainsets for the Adirondack will have six passenger cars, which will include a cab control car food service area and a mix of 2x2 Coach Class and 2x1 Business Class seating. The car closest to the locomotive will have batteries to supply electricity to traction motors in the locomotive when operating in Penn Station and the Empire Connection tunnel, eliminating the need for third rail propulsion. The arrangement will eliminate the time-consuming locomotive change Albany–Rensselaer.

Route 
The Adirondack operates over Canadian National Railway, Canadian Pacific Railway, CSX Transportation, Metro-North Railroad and Amtrak rails:
CN St-Hyacinthe Subdivision, Montreal to Southwark:  
CN Rouses Point Subdivision, Southwark to Rouses Point: 
CP Canadian Subdivision, Rouses Point to Ballston: 
CP Freight Subdivision, Ballston to Schenectady: 
CSX Hudson Subdivision, Schenectady to Poughkeepsie (trackage leased by Amtrak): 
Metro-North Hudson Line, Poughkeepsie to Spuyten Duyvil: 
Amtrak Empire Connection, Spuyten Duyvil to Penn Station 

Unlike the Maple Leaf, which is operated by Via Rail crews while in Canada, the Adirondack (like Cascades trains to Vancouver) is operated solely by Amtrak personnel.

Station stops

References

Notes

External links 

Amtrak routes
Named passenger trains of Canada
International named passenger trains
Railway services introduced in 1974
Passenger rail transport in Quebec
Passenger rail transportation in New York (state)